CrowdRise is a for-profit crowdfunding platform that raises charitable donations.  CrowdRise was founded by Edward Norton, Shauna Robertson, and the founders of Moosejaw, Robert and Jeffrey Wolfe.  CrowdRise was acquired in 2017 by GoFundMe.

Overview 
CrowdRise's fundraising model is based upon the notion of making giving back fun, which may lead to more people donating and more funds being raised. The platform uses gamification and a rewards point system to engage users to participate in fundraising and donating.

Its primary model is donation-based, and the campaign defaults to keep-what-you-raise.

Their default "Starter" pricing is to charge the non-profit a 5% platform fee from each donation, plus a payment processing fee (credit card fee) of 2.9% + $0.30 per donation. Donors may choose whether to pay the fee in addition to the amount of their donation or to have the fee subtracted from their donation amount before being delivered.

See also 

 Angel investor
 Civic crowdfunding
 Comparison of crowd funding services
 Crowdfunding
 List of most successful crowdfunding projects
 Microcredit
 Microfinance
 Threshold pledge system
 Virtual volunteering

References

Further reading

External links 

American fundraising websites
Crowdfunding platforms of the United States
2007 software
Gamification